Vincent Trummer (born 18 May 2000) is an Austrian footballer who plays for SV Lafnitz.

Club career
On 11 January 2023, Trummer signed with SV Lafnitz.

References

2000 births
Living people
Association football defenders
Austrian footballers
Austria youth international footballers
SK Sturm Graz players
SV Lafnitz players
Austrian Football Bundesliga players
2. Liga (Austria) players
Austrian Regionalliga players